The FairWild Foundation is an international organization that aims to provide a global framework for a sustainable and fair trading system for wild-collected plant ingredients and their products. It was established in 2008 in response to the major ecological and social challenges created by the ever-increasing demand for wild plant ingredients used in food, cosmetics, well-being and medicinal products.

FairWild Standard 
The International Standard for Sustainable Wild Collection of Medicinal and Aromatic Plants (ISSC-MAP) was developed between 2001 and 2006, supported by the German Federal Agency for Nature Conservation (BfN), TRAFFIC, WWF, and International Union for Conservation of Nature. In 2007 ISSC-MAP was officially launched. A year later this merged with the FairWild foundation to form the FairWild standard, which promotes and certifies wild products which are harvested in a way which is sustainable for both the environment and local communities. 

The development of the Fair Trade standard was initiated by the Swiss Import Promotion Programme in cooperation with Forum Essenzia e.V and Institute for Marketecology. This was then merged with ISSC-MAP to form the FairWild Standard version 1.0 in 2008 to provide all round implementation of ecological, social and economical aspects. 
 
The current FairWild Standard version 2.0 was published in 2010. It combined the FairWild Standard 1.0 with practical experience gained through application of the Standard in the field. Its implementation helps support efforts to ensure plants are managed, harvested and traded in a way that maintains populations in the wild and benefits rural producers.

The FairWild Standard ensures that best practice guidelines are maintained in the following key areas:

 Maintaining wild plant resources with no negative environmental impacts.
 Complying with laws, regulations and agreements.
 Respecting customary rights and benefit sharing.
 Promoting fair contractual agreements between operators and collectors, and ensuring fair trade benefits for collectors and their communities.
 Ensuring fair working conditions for all workers.
 Applying responsible business and management practices.

FairWild Certification 
Use of FairWild Certification serves to provide consumers with the assurance that products are produced in a socially and ecologically sound manner. Before products can display the FairWild certification, all those involved in the national or international supply chain need to be assessed, including collectors, traders, and exporters in the country of origin.

Certification is based on a number of factors including resource assessment, management plans, sustainable collecting practices, cost calculation along the supply chain, traceability of goods and finances, and documented fair trading practices. FairWild is only applicable to wild harvested plants (except for timber products), lichens and fungi, and does not include cultivated plants.

Products 
FairWild certified ingredients are available from producer companies in a number of countries worldwide. Certification audits (according to FairWild Standard version 1.0) began in 2007, with the first products containing FairWild-certified ingredients available on the market in 2009. Currently, products containing certified ingredients include herbal teas, frankincense, scented pillows. and traditional Chinese medicines (TCM). FairWild sustainable use projects are continuing successfully in various regions around the world.

Countries that currently either produce or distribute FairWild ingredients include Armenia, Azerbaijan, Bolivia, Bosnia and Herzegovina, Bulgaria, Hungary, Kazakhstan, Kenya, Macedonia, Poland, and Spain.

FairWild and International Policy

The FairWild Standard is useful for bridging the gap between existing broad conservation guidelines and managing plans developed for specific local conditions.

FairWild and the Convention on the International Trade in Endangered species of Fauna and Flora (CITES)
Countries exporting plants and animals species listed in Appendix II of CITES are required to demonstrate a level of export that is not detrimental to the survival of that species. This is achieved through the compilation of a Non-detriment finding (NDF) by CITES of which the ecological criteria of the FairWild Standard is a contributor.

FairWild and the Convention on Biological Diversity (CBD)
The GSPC (Global Strategy for Plant Conservation), adopted by the CBD in 2002, covers issues of sustainable use of plant diversity  and benefit-sharing with the aim to contribute to the alleviation of poverty and sustainable development  via inclusion of such targets in government policy. The breadth and flexibility of the FairWild Standard make the FairWild Foundation an ideal partner for governments and NGO's working towards fulfillment of GSPC targets.

FairWild Week 
FairWild Week, founded in 2017, is the organization's annual event used to raise awareness of the importance of wild plants and their sustainable harvest.

References

International organisations based in Switzerland
Fair trade organizations